Aticaprant, also known by its developmental codes JNJ-67953964, CERC-501, and LY-2456302, is a κ-opioid receptor (KOR) antagonist which is under development for the treatment of major depressive disorder. A regulatory application for approval of the medication is expected to be submitted by 2025. Aticaprant is taken by mouth.

Side effects of aticaprant include itching, among others. Aticaprant acts as a selective antagonist of the KOR, the biological target of the endogenous opioid peptide dynorphin. The medication has decent selectivity for the KOR over the μ-opioid receptor (MOR) and other targets, a relatively long half-life of 30 to 40hours, and readily crosses the blood–brain barrier to produce central effects.

Aticaprant was originally developed by Eli Lilly, was under development by Cerecor for a time, and is now under development by Janssen Pharmaceuticals. As of July 2022, it is in phase 3 clinical trials for major depressive disorder. Like other kappa opioid antagonists currently under clinical investigation for the treatment of major depression, its efficacy may be compromised by the countervailing activation of pro-inflammatory cytokines in microglia within the CNS.

Aticaprant was also under development for the treatment of alcoholism, cocaine use disorder, and smoking withdrawal, but development for these indications was discontinued.

Pharmacology

Pharmacodynamics
Aticaprant is a potent, selective, short-acting (i.e., non-"inactivating") antagonist of the KOR (Ki = 0.81 nM vs. 24.0 nM and 155 nM for the μ-opioid receptor (MOR) and δ-opioid receptor (DOR), respectively; approximately 30-fold selectivity for the KOR). The drug has been found to dose-dependently block fentanyl-induced miosis at 25 mg and 60 mg in humans (with minimal to no blockade at doses of 4 to 10 mg), suggesting that the drug significantly occupies and antagonizes the MOR at a dose of at least 25 mg but not of 10 mg or less. However, a more recent study assessing neuroendocrine effects of the drug in normal volunteers and subjects with a history of cocaine dependence reported observations consistent with modest MOR antagonism at the 10 mg dose. In animal models of depression, aticaprant has been found to have potent synergistic efficacy in combination with other antidepressants such as citalopram and imipramine.

Positron emission tomography imaging revealed that brain KORs were almost completely saturated by the drug 2.5 hours following a single dose of 10 mg, which supported the 4 mg to 25 mg dosages that aticaprant is being explored at in clinical trials. Occupancy was 35% for a 0.5 mg dose and 94% for a 10 mg dose. At 24 hours post-dose, receptor occupancy was 19% for 0.5 mg and 82% for 25 mg. No serious side effects were observed, and all side effects seen were mild to moderate and were not thought to be due to aticaprant.

Pharmacokinetics
The oral bioavailability of aticaprant is 25%. The drug is rapidly absorbed, with maximal concentrations occurring 1 to 2 hours after administration. It has an elimination half-life of 30 to 40 hours in healthy subjects. The circulating levels of aticaprant increase proportionally with increasing doses. Steady-state concentrations are reached after 6 to 8 days of once-daily dosing. Aticaprant has been shown to reproducibly penetrate the blood–brain barrier.

History
Aticaprant was originally developed by Eli Lilly under the code name LY-2456302. It first appeared in the scientific literature in 2010 or 2011. The compound was first patented in 2009.

In February 2015, Cerecor Inc. announced that they had acquired the rights from Eli Lilly to develop and commercialize LY-2456302 (under the new developmental code CERC-501).

As of 2016, aticaprant has reached phase II clinical trials as an augmentation to antidepressant therapy for treatment-resistant depression. A phase II study of aticaprant in heavy smokers was commenced in early 2016 and results of the study were expected before the end of 2016. Aticaprant failed to meet its main endpoint for nicotine withdrawal in the study.

In August 2017, it was announced that Cerecor had sold its rights to aticaprant to Janssen Pharmaceuticals. Janssen was also experimenting with esketamine for the treatment of depression as of 2017.

Research
In addition to major depressive disorder, aticaprant was under development for the treatment of alcoholism, cocaine use disorder, and smoking withdrawal. However, development for these indications was discontinued.

See also
 κ-Opioid receptor § Antagonists
 List of investigational antidepressants

References

Further reading

External links
 Aticaprant - Eli Lilly and Company/Janssen Pharmaceuticals - AdisInsight

Antidepressants
Benzamides
Drug rehabilitation
Experimental drugs
Fluoroarenes
Kappa-opioid receptor antagonists
Mu-opioid receptor antagonists
Pyrrolidines
Synthetic opioids